The 1996–97 All-Ireland Senior Club Hurling Championship was the 27th staging of the All-Ireland Senior Club Hurling Championship, the Gaelic Athletic Association's premier inter-county club hurling tournament. The championship began on 22 September 1996 and ended on 17 March 1997.

Sixmilebridge were the defending champions, however, they failed to qualify after being defeated in the Clare Senior Championship.

On 17 March 1996, Athenry won the championship after a 0–14 to 1–08 defeat of Wolfe Tones in the All-Ireland final at Croke Park. It was their first ever championship title.

Ballygunner's Paul Flynn was the championship's top scorer with 3-21.

Results

Connacht Senior Club Hurling Championship

First round

Quarter-final

Semi-final

Final

Leinster Senior Club Hurling Championship

Preliminary round

First round

Quarter-finals

Semi-finals

Final

Munster Senior Club Hurling Championship

Quarter-finals

Semi-finals

Final

Ulster Senior Club Hurling Championship

Semi-finals

Final

All-Ireland Senior Club Hurling Championship

Quarter-final

Semi-finals

Final

Championship statistics

Top scorers

Overall

References

1996 in hurling
1997 in hurling
All-Ireland Senior Club Hurling Championship